Beehunter may refer to:

Beehunter, Indiana, a community in the United States
Beehunter, another word for the Beewolf